The Orland E. White Arboretum (172 acres), also known as the State Arboretum of Virginia, is an arboretum operated by the University of Virginia as part of the Blandy Experimental Farm (700 acres). It is located at 400 Blandy Farm Lane, Boyce, Virginia, and open to visitors daily from dawn to dusk without fee. 

Graham F. Blandy bequeathed 700 acres of his 900 estate known as Blandy Farm to Virginia to use horticultural research. The farm's first director, Orland Emile White, established the arboretum a year after Blandy's death and upon White's retirement in 1955 it was named in his honor upon his retirement. Early research focused on cytological reconstruction of plant phylogenies and the consequences of irradiation-induced mutations. It became the official State Arboretum in 1986.

Today the arboretum is maintained primarily for environmental research and education for university, K-12 and general audiences. It contains more than 8,000 trees and woody shrubs, representing over 1,000 species and cultivated varieties of plants in 50 plant families. Of particular interest are its collection  of boxwood cultivars (said to be the largest in North America) and its pine collection, representing over half of the world's species. Other arboretum features include a Ginkgo biloba grove (more than 300 trees), the Virginia Native Plant Trail (established 1997), extensive meadows, and plantings of azalea, beech, buckeye, catalpa, Cedar of Lebanon, crabapple, holly, lilac, linden, magnolia, maple, stuartia, and viburnum.

See also 
 List of botanical gardens in the United States

External links 
 Blandy Experimental Farm: The State Arboretum of Virginia
 Inside UVA Online: Blandy Farm

Arboreta in Virginia
White Research Arboretum
Protected areas of Clarke County, Virginia
University of Virginia